Class, Bureaucracy, and Schools: The Illusion of Educational Change in America is a 1971 book by American historian Michael B. Katz.  The book focuses on the history of education in the United States between 1800 and 1885 in public elementary schools, and follows their transition from one-room schools to centralized, bureaucratic school systems.  The book was revised and expanded in 1975.

Publication history
Class, Bureaucracy and Schools: The Illusion of Educational Change in America, Praeger (New York City), 1971, revised edition, 1975.

See also
Education reform

References

Further reading
Michaelsen, Jacob B. (1977). Revision, Bureaucracy, and School Reform: A Critique of Katz. The School Review. 85(2): 229–246. 
Wise, Arthur E. (1982). Legislated Learning: The Bureaucratization of the American Classroom. University of California Press. .

1971 non-fiction books
Books about education
History books about the United States